Baerbel Kösters Lucchitta (October 2, 1938, Münster, Germany) is a Scientist Emeritus at the Astrogeology Science Center at the USGS and one of the first women in the field of Astrogeology. She was one of the people responsible of making lunar maps for the Apollo 11 mission. During her career, she was dedicated to mapping the Moon, Mars, Europa and the Galilean Satellites, and Antarctica. The Lucchitta Glacier is named after her work in Antarctica, and the Asteroid 4569 Baerbel is named after her work in planetary geology.

Life and career 

She was born before the beginning of World War II, and her family had to move around out of fear of the war. Her father was a conscript soldier and later a war prisoner. He gathered back in Münster with his family in 1947 after being released in England. Baerbel attended a Catholic all-girl, public high school in Germany. After she graduated from school, she went to study Geology.

She was awarded a Fulbright scholarship and moved into Kent State University in Ohio, where she earned a B.S. degree in Geology in 1961. She earned an assistantship position at Pennsylvania State University, and she received a M.S. degree in 1963 and in 1966 earned a Ph.D. in structural geology. She then moved to Flagstaff, and from 1967 to her retirement in 1995 she worked at the USGS. In 1995 she was named Scientist Emerita at the USGS. From 1995 to 2003 she was an Adjunct faculty member at Northern Arizona University.

She is known for her work in mapping and the use of satellite imagery for geological and glaciological studies. She is also known for her theories on the influence of ice in the geology of Mars.

She married geologist Ivo Lucchitta in 1964.

Honors and awards 

 Centennial Fellow, Department of Earth and Mineral Sciences, Pennsylvania State University (1996).
 G.K. Gilbert Award for the Planetary Geology Division, Geological Society of America (1995).
 U.S. Department of the Interior Meritorious Service Award (1994).
 USGS Special Achievement Award (1983).
 NASA Special Recognition Group Award, 10th Anniversary, Lunar Program (1979).
 Minor planet 4569 Baerbel is named in her honor

References 

Living people
Astrogeologists
1938 births
20th-century American geologists
20th-century American women scientists
21st-century American geologists
21st-century American women scientists
American women geologists
United States Geological Survey personnel
People from Münster
German emigrants to the United States
Kent State University alumni
Penn State College of Earth and Mineral Sciences alumni
Northern Arizona University faculty
Planetary scientists
Women planetary scientists
American women academics